Pedro Estay (29 May 1929 – 17 September 2011) was a Chilean sports shooter. He competed in the trap event at the 1968 Summer Olympics.

References

1929 births
2011 deaths
Chilean male sport shooters
Olympic shooters of Chile
Shooters at the 1968 Summer Olympics
Sportspeople from Santiago